Novotroitskoye is a rural locality (a selo) and the administrative centre of Novotroitsky Selsoviet, Chishminsky District, Bashkortostan, Russia. The population was 411 as of 2010. There are 11 streets.

Geography 
Novotroitskoye is located 22 km southeast of Chishmy (the district's administrative centre) by road. Novosayranovo is the nearest rural locality.

References 

Rural localities in Chishminsky District